Navicula stesvicensis is a species of algae in the genus Navicula which has been isolated from the Danube river.

References

Further reading
 
 westerndiatoms.colorado.edu

stesvicensis
Species described in 1880